Small Avalanches and Other Stories is a young adult collection of short stories by Joyce Carol Oates. It was her second young adult book and, as of January 2007, her only collection of short stories for young adults. It was published in 2003 by HarperTempest, an imprint of HarperCollins.

Stories
The collection includes a mix of previously published and new stories. The following stories appear:

 Where Are You Going, Where Have You Been?
 The Sky Blue Ball
 Small Avalanches
 Haunted
 Bad Girls
 How I Contemplated the World...
 Shot
 Why Don't You Come Live With Me It's Time
 Life After High School
 Capricorn
 The Visit
 The Model

References

2003 short story collections
Short story collections by Joyce Carol Oates
Young adult short story collections
HarperCollins books